A microchromosome (μChr) is a type of very small chromosome which is a typical component of the karyotype of birds, some reptiles, fish, and amphibians; they have yet to be found in mammals. They are less than 20 Mb in size; chromosomes which are greater than 40 Mb in size are known as macrochromosomes (MChrs), while those between 20 and 40 Mb are classified as intermediate chromosomes.  Microchromosomes are characteristically very small and often cytogenetically indistinguishable in a karyotype.

While originally thought to be insignificant fragments of chromosomes, in species where they have been studied they have been found to be rich in genes and high in GC content. In chickens, microchromosomes have been estimated to contain between 50 and 75% of all genes. The presence of microchromosomes makes ordering and identifying chromosomes into a coherent karyotype particularly difficult. During metaphase, they appear merely as 0.5-1.5 μm long specks. Their small size and poor condensation into heterochromatin means they generally lack the diagnostic banding patterns and distinct centromere locations used for chromosome identification. 

μChrs, where they are found, interact closely with each other and are well-conserved. The genomic organization of Florida lancelet – part of a sister group to all vertebrates – paints a picture of a possible ancestral amniote (and vertebrates in general) genome consisting entirely of μChrs. Comparison between lancelet and modern vertebrate chromosomes shows that the MChrs are a result of fusion between μChrs. In addition, retention of μChrs is shown to be the norm; the complete loss of them in mammals is the outlier instead.

In birds

Birds (except Falconidae) usually have karyotypes of approximately 80 chromosomes (2n = 80), with only a few being distinguishable macrochromosomes and an average of 60 being microchromosomes.  They are more abundant in birds than any other group of animals. Chickens (Gallus gallus) are an important model organism for studying microchromosomes. Examination of microchromosomes in birds has led to the hypotheses that they may have originated as conserved fragments of ancestral macrochromosomes, and conversely that macrochromosomes could have arisen as aggregates of microchromosomes. Comparative genomic analysis shows that microchromosomes contain genetic information which has been conserved across multiple classes of chromosomes. This indicates that at least ten chicken microchromosomes arose from fission of larger chromosomes and that the typical bird karyotype arose 100–250 mya.

Chickens
Chickens have a diploid number of 78 (2n = 78) chromosomes, and as is usual in birds, the majority are microchromosomes. Classification of chicken chromosomes varies by author. Some classify them as 6 pairs of macrochromosomes, one pair of sex chromosomes, with the remaining 32 pairs being intermediate or microchromosomes. Other arrangements such as that used by the International Chicken Genome Sequencing Consortium include five pairs of macrochromosomes, five pairs of intermediate chromosomes, and twenty-eight pairs of microchromosomes. Microchromosomes represent approximately one third of the total genome size, and have been found to have a much higher gene density than macrochromosomes. Because of this, it is estimated that the majority of genes are located on microchromosomes, though due to the difficulty in physically identifying microchromosomes and the lack of microsatellite markers, it has been difficult to place genes on specific microchromosomes.

Replication timing and recombination rates have been found to differ between micro- and macrochromosomes in chickens. Microchromosomes replicate earlier in the S phase of interphase than macrochromosomes. Recombination rates have also been found to be higher on microchromosomes. Possibly due to the high recombination rates, chicken chromosome 16 (a microchromosome) has been found to contain the most genetic diversity of any chromosome in certain chicken breeds. This is likely due to the presence on this chromosome of the major histocompatibility complex (MHC).

For the many small linkage groups in the chicken genome which have not been placed on chromosomes, the assumption has been made that they are located on the microchromosomes. Groups of these correspond almost exactly with large sections of certain human chromosomes. For example, linkage groups E29C09W09, E21E31C25W12, E48C28W13W27, E41W17, E54 and E49C20W21 correspond with chromosome 7.

Turkey
The turkey has a diploid number of 80 (2n = 80) chromosomes.  The karyotype contains an additional chromosomal pair relative to the chicken due to the presence of at least two fission/fusion differences (GGA2 = MGA3 and MGA6 and GGA4 = MGA4 and MGA9).  Given these differences involving the macrochromosomes, an additional fission/fusion must also exist between the species involving the microchromosomes if the diploid numbers are valid.   Other rearrangements have been identified through comparative genetic maps, physical maps and whole genome sequencing.

In turtles 
Microchromosomes play a key role in sex determination in soft-shelled turtles.

In humans and other animals
Microchromosomes are absent from the karyotypes of mammals and "higher" amphibians. (The monotreme platypus has an intermediate karyotype with smaller chromosomes that are not quite "micro".)

In rare cases, microchromosomes have been observed in the karotypes of individual humans. A link has been suggested between microchromosome presence and certain genetic disorders like Down syndrome  and fragile X syndrome. The smallest chromosome in humans is normally chromosome 21, which is 47 Mb.

See also
Minichromosome

External links 
 David Nield: 'Useless Specks of Dust' Turn Out to Be Building Blocks of All Vertebrate Genomes. On: sciencealert, 3 November 2021 (Lay summary for Waters et al., 2021)

References

Nuclear substructures
Cytogenetics